The Episcopal Church in the United States of America currently has 111 dioceses. When the church was founded in 1785, it only had nine.

These were:

Episcopal Diocese of Massachusetts
Episcopal Diocese of Connecticut
Episcopal Diocese of Pennsylvania
Episcopal Diocese of Virginia
Episcopal Diocese of New York
Episcopal Diocese of Maryland
Episcopal Diocese of New Jersey
Episcopal Diocese of Delaware
Episcopal Diocese of South Carolina

They are represented by the nine white crosses arranged in a St. Andrew's Cross on a blue field (canton) on the Church arms and flag. The rest of the flag is a red St. George’s Cross on a white field reminiscent of the former national flag of the old Kingdom of England before the first Act of Union in 1706/1707 uniting England and Scotland.

In 2012, due to disputes over theology and authority, the standing committee of the Diocese of South Carolina voted to withdraw the entire diocese from  The Episcopal Church in the U.S.A. and become an autonomous Anglican diocese, joining the Anglican Church in North America in June 2017. The Episcopal Church maintained that an Episcopal diocese cannot withdraw itself from the national church. There is therefore a dispute over which South Carolina diocese is the successor to the diocese that was one of the original nine. The South Carolina entity which currently operates as a still constituent part of the ECUSA uses the name "Episcopal Church in South Carolina"; the diocese which withdrew is called the "Anglican Diocese of South Carolina".

See also
List of Episcopal bishops

Original
Episcopal